The 1968 World Sportscar Championship season was the 16th season of FIA World Sportscar Championship racing and featured the 1968 International Championship for Makes and the 1968 International Cup for GT Cars. The former was contested by Group 6 Sports Prototypes, Group 4 Sports Cars and Group 3 Grand Touring Cars and the later by Group 3 Grand Touring Cars only. The two titles were decided over a ten race series which ran from 3 February 1968 to 29 September 1968, but one race was only worth half points, and only the five best results were counted. 

Following a very fast 1967 24 Hours of Le Mans, the engine size of prototypes from 1968 onwards was limited to 3 litres, forcing the retirement of Ford's 7-litre prototypes as well as Ferrari's 4-litre P series. Even though the engine size was the same as in Formula 1 since 1966, the F1 engines did not last 1000km or 24 hours, while downsized engines lacked power and torque, causing a problem for the prototype class. Ferrari stayed absent in protest, while old 5-litre Ford GT40 as well as Lola and some others makes could still enter as sportscars if at least 50 cars had been built. 

Up to 1966, Porsche had only entered in the two-litre class, and for 1968 developed the 3-litre Porsche 908 which had teething problems, just like the Ford P68, so most wins for Zuffenhausen came with the underpowered 2.2-litre Porsche 907. Also, the Alfa Romeo Tipo 33/2 in early 1968 had only 2000cc, not enough to win races. As a result, and with only 5 of 10 races counting towards the championship, the 1968 International Championship for Makes was won by Ford Motor Company as the Ford GT40 introduced in 1964, after being uncompetitive in the early rounds in the USA at Daytona and Sebring, won five races including its most prestigious and also last round, Le Mans, which had been postponed from the usual mid-June date to late September due to political unrest. 

Porsche also scored five wins, but the 500km "short" race at Zeltweg was only awarded half points, and with only four full-point wins and four second places in nine full-point events, Porsche came second in the WSC with 42 points to Fords 45, as 25.5 points were discarded, compared to Fords 6, scored with 3rd places at Nürburgring and Zeltweg. Porsche's only non-top-two-finish came at the third-to-last round, 6h at Watkins Glen, where no less than four factory 908 were entered in an all-in attempt to secure the championship ahead of the insignificant half-point Zeltweg and the all-important Le Mans. Siffert took pole position ahead of Ickx, but after three 908 were out and the fourth limped to 6th place, two private old 906E were ahead of the factory, behind two GT40 and even a gasturbine-powered Howmet TX which was rated at 2960 cm³ and thus allowed as a prototype.

The International Cup for GT Cars was won by Porsche entering the Porsche 911.

Schedule

† - These races were contested by Sports Prototypes and Sports Cars only. GT cars did not participate.

‡ - The 24 Hours of Le Mans was originally scheduled to be run 15 June and 16, but was delayed due to a workers strike in France.

Season results

Races

Manufacturers Championships

International Championship for Makes
Points were awarded for overall placings gained by the top 6 finishers from Groups 6, 4 & 3 at each round in the order of 9-6-4-3-2-1 †.  Manufacturers were only given points for their highest finishing car; any other cars from that manufacturer were merely skipped in the points standings.

Cars from other than Groups 6, 4 & 3 were ignored in the awarding of points for the overall championship.

Only the best 5 round results for each make counted towards the championship, with any other points earned not included in the total. Relinquished points are shown within brackets.

† - Round 9 was awarded only half points due to its short distance.

International Cup for GT Cars
Points were awarded for Group placings gained by the top six GT finishers at each round in the order of 9-6-4-3-2-1.  Manufacturers were only given points for their highest finishing car; any other cars from that manufacturer were merely skipped in the points standings.

Only the best 5 round results for each make counted towards the title, with any other points earned not included in the total. Relinquished points are shown within brackets.

The GT class did not participate in Rounds 3 and 9.

Car Details
The following models contributed to the nett points totals of their respective manufacturers.

International Championship for Makes
 Ford GT40
 Porsche 907 & 908
 Alfa Romeo T33/2
 Alpine A211 Renault
 Chevrolet Corvette
 Howmet TX Continental
 Ferrari 250LM
 Lola T70 Mk3 Chevrolet

International Cup for GT Cars
 Porsche 911S & 911T
 Chevrolet Corvette
 MGB & MGBGT
 Lancia Fulvia Sport
 Fiat Dino

References

External links
 Points tables for the 1968 International Championship for Makes Retrieved from wspr-racing.com on 25 March 2009
 Round results for the 1968 International Championship for Makes Retrieved from wspr-racing.com on 25 March 2009
 Images from the 1968 International Championship for Makes Retrieved from www.racingsportscars.com on 25 March 2009

World Sportscar Championship seasons
World Sportscar Championship season